Kajuiyeh (also Romanized as Kajūīyeh; also known as Kowjū’īyeh) is a village in Dehaj Rural District, Dehaj District, Shahr-e Babak County, Kerman Province, Iran. At the 2006 census, its population was 266, in 59 families.

References 

Populated places in Shahr-e Babak County